Synergy is the third studio album by Norwegian Christian extreme metal band Extol. It was released in 2003 on Century Media, but was licensed to Solid State Records.

With this album, the band shifted more towards a progressive death/thrash sound. The Norwegian singer-songwriter Maria Solheim performs guest vocals on "Paradigms". The session guitarist Tore Moren plays guitar solo on "Nihilism 2002" and the first solo on "Psychopath". Samuel Durling of the death industrial band Mental Destruction performs distorted vocals on "Emancipation".

The album was recorded at Top Room Studios. It was produced by Børge Finstad and was mixed at Fagerborg Studios and Top Room Studios. Morten Lund mastered the album at Masterhuset AS. The album cover was painted by Hugh Syme, who has done work for such groups as Iron Maiden, Megadeth, Rush and Fates Warning. The band says that the cover picture "illustrates the synergy effect of elements working together (monk and Death) and thus gaining strength beyond what the effect would be if all the elements would be working separately."

Reception

Stephanie Sollow of Progressive World gave the album a very positive review, writing: "Extol are very good at what they do, playing a very tight and intricately arranged form of progressive thrash metal, if you will. They transition easily between different meters, all while creating a heavy wall of sound though which a guitar lead or some dynamic cymbal work will poke through for its lead spot."

Track listing

Personnel
Peter Espevoll – vocals, acoustic guitar
Ole Børud – guitars, clean vocals
Christer Espevoll – guitars
John Robert Mjåland – bass
David Husvik – drums, backing vocals

References

2003 albums
Extol albums
Century Media Records albums
Solid State Records albums